Ed Sprague may refer to:

Ed Sprague Sr. (1945–2020), pitcher in major league baseball 1968-1976
Ed Sprague Jr. (born 1967), third baseman in major league baseball 1991-2001